This is a list of herbaria in North America, organized first by country or region where the herbarium is located, then within each region by size of the collection. All herbarium codes follow the Index Herbarium. For other continents, see List of herbaria.

Canada

Central America and the Caribbean
The table below lists herbaria located in Central America and the Caribbean.

Mexico

United States

References

Biology-related lists
Nature-related lists
Herbaria